Valeriy Viktorovych Koroviy (Ukrainian: Валерій Вікторович Коровій; born on 10 November 1964), is a Ukrainian politician, who previously served as the Governor of Vinnytsia Oblast from 28 February 2015 to 18 September 2019.

Biography
Valeriy Koroviy was born in Trostianets, Ukraine on 10 November 1964.

He graduated from Trostyanets Secondary School in 1982. After graduating from school he worked as a pupil of a turner in the Trostyanets District Association "Agricultural Technology". From 1982 to 1984 he was in regular service in the Soviet Army.

From 1984 to 1989 he studied at the Faculty of Economics of the Ukrainian Agricultural Academy. From 1990 to 1992 he worked as an economist of the collective farm "Fatherland", smt. Stryzhavka of Vinnitsa district and the head of planning and economic Vinnytsia inter-farm enterprise of granite products. In 1994, he graduated from the postgraduate study at the Institute of Economics of the Academy of Sciences of Ukraine, and defended the dissertation paper of the candidate of economic sciences ahead of time.

From 2000 to 2006, he was the Deputy Head of the Vinnytsia Oblast. At the end of 2006, he was promoted as the First Deputy Governor of Vinnytsia Oblast.

Appointed on 14 July 2011, he had worked as deputy mayor of Vinnytsia.

He is married and has two sons.

Corruption Persecution
All-Ukrainian Movement Against Political Corruption "Under Control!" found that the Head of the Vinnytsia Regional State Administration, Valery Koroviy, signed an order dated June 29, 2014, in which three foreign-made cars were recognized as humanitarian aid for people with disabilities. One of the cars was Oleksandr Pron,  director of the state enterprise "Vinnitsilisservis". The sum of possible losses is ₴1.2 million.

References

1964 births
Living people
People from Vinnytsia Oblast
21st-century Ukrainian politicians
Governors of Vinnytsia Oblast
Recipients of the Honorary Diploma of the Cabinet of Ministers of Ukraine